Stevenson Isaiah McDuffie (born July 21, 1999) is an American football inside linebacker for the Green Bay Packers of the National Football League (NFL). He played college football at Boston College.

College career
In July 2015, he committed to play college football for Syracuse; in May 2016, he de-committed from Syracuse and committed to Boston College.

He played college football at Boston College from 2017 to 2020. In 2020, he was selected Second-team All-ACC.

Professional career

McDuffie was selected 220th overall by the Green Bay Packers in the 2021 NFL Draft. He signed his rookie contract on May 14, 2021.

McDuffie was named the fourth linebacker on the depth chart to begin the 2022 season, behind De'Vondre Campbell, Quay Walker, and Krys Barnes. He saw the first significant action of his career on October 30, 2022 during a Week 8 loss to the Buffalo Bills, with Barnes on injured reserve and both Walker and Campbell exiting the game early due to an ejection and a knee injury, respectively. McDuffie became the primary defensive playcaller on the defense, playing alongside the recently signed Eric Wilson. He started the Packers' Week 9 game against the Detroit Lions alongside Walker, despite Barnes being healthy, and with Campbell still sidelined, making 5 tackles and finishing the game with a Pro Football Focus grade of 91.1.

NFL career statistics

Regular season

Postseason

References

External links
Green Bay Packers bio
Boston College Eagles bio

1999 births
Living people
Players of American football from Buffalo, New York
American football linebackers
Boston College Eagles football players
Green Bay Packers players